Plasma cannon may refer to:

Plasma weapon, a type of raygun that fires a stream, bolt, pulse or toroid of plasma
Plasma railgun, a linear accelerator which, like a projectile railgun, uses two long parallel electrodes to accelerate a "sliding short" armature
MARAUDER, a United States Air Force Research Laboratory project concerning the development of a coaxial plasma railgun
Plasma-powered cannon, an experimental weapon which uses plasma to fire a solid projectile

See also 
Plasma (disambiguation)
Plasma gun (disambiguation)